Anak-ku Sazali which means Sazali My Son is a 1956 Malaysian melodrama film directed and written by Phani Majumdar. The movie is about love between a man and a woman, dreams that can come true and a father's extreme love for his son.  The talented Tan Sri P. Ramlee plays the adult father character, Hassan as well as the spoilt son, Sazali Hassan.

Plot

Hassan is an orphan who works with a rich family. The rich man has two children, Mansor (a boy)) and Mahani (a girl). Hassan developed an interest in music to the point that he is willing to spend whatever money he has earned to buy a violin.  Once Hassan purchases the violin, he starts studying music from a violin teacher.

Hassan's friendship with Mansor and Mahani is close. As all of three of them reaches adulthood, Mansor went to Singapore to study while Mahani was to be married to her father's choice. Hassan, who is in love with Mahani, cannot accept the marriage arrangement and decides to flee to Singapore. Mahani, who also loves Hassan follows him to Singapore.  Both of them take a train ride to Singapore and meet up with Mansor at the train station.  Mansor was surprised to his sister, Mahani and realised that Mahani has left their family behind to be with Hassan.  Hassan explains the situation to Mansor and Mansor accepts that Hassan and Mahani really love each other.

Mahani and Hassan marries with Mansor's consent. Mansor also marries a girl named Rubiah. After that Hassan continues his interest in music and becomes a famous musician.  While Mansor, Rubiah, Hassan, Mahani and a few other guests were listening to Hassan's new single, Mahani collapses from a terrible headache.  Mansor calls a doctor and the doctor attends to Mahani.  The doctor then informed Hassan that Mahani is pregnant with their first child.  Hassan was delighted and even then, Hassan felt that the unborn baby will be a baby boy.

During her pregnancy, Mahani began to feel that she is going to die.  Mahani decides to approach Hassan in a soft manner and made Hassan promise to take care of their unborn child citing that no one except Hassan must take care of the child.  Hassan promises he will and even composes a song titled "Anakku Sazali" for his unborn son.  While Hassan sings the song to Mahani, Mahani starts having a terrible headache and goes into labour.

After delivering the baby, Hassan was informed by the doctor that Mahani gave birth to a baby boy.  Hassan is happy and starts inquiring about Mahani.  This is when the doctor informs Hassan that Mahani has died while giving birth to their son.  Hassan is devastated. Hassan starts caring for his son, whom he named Sazali, in an adoring manner.  Hassan even sings the song "Anakku Sazali" every time his baby boy sleeps.  During a period of time caring for Sazali, Hassan visits Mansor to see his newborn baby girl, Rokiah.  Hassan makes a promise to Mansor that when Sazali grows up, Hassan will make sure Sazali marries Mansor's daughter.  During this time, Mansor's wife, Rubiah, notices that Hassan's health is declining.  Upon inquiring, Hassan reveals that during the day, he is happy with Sazali's laughter and character but when night time arrives, Hassan constantly remembers his wife and misses her terribly.  Rubiah encourages Hassan to get married but Hassan refuses.  Hassan brushes off Rubiah's inquiry and states that the reason he came to Mansor's house is to see his future daughter in law.

Soon, Sazali and Rokiah are little kids.  They start playing together.  During this time, Sazali's pampered attitude is apparent.  While they are playing at the seaside, little Rokiah is building a castle.  Little Sazali decides to destroy the castle as little Rokiah tells him that the castle is a symbol of love.  Little Rokiah runs to Hassan and complaints to him that little Sazali has purposely destroyed her castle.  When inquired by Hassan, little Sazali starts lying and says that he accidentally trips and fell on the castle.

During night time as Hassan practices the violin, little Rokiah inquired about her music box that was missing.  As Rokiah's mother, Rubiah, Hassan and Rokiah start searching for the box, Hassan finally found it hidden among some books on a shelf.  Hassan covers for Sazali and pretends to say he found Rokiah's box behind a cushion.  After Rokiah's mother, Rubiah and Rokiah leaves the living room, Hassan confronts Sazali about the music box.  Sazali at first denied that he stole the box.  Sazali then said that he hid the box because he loved Rokiah and his only mistake was lying to Hassan.

Hassan was called to school because of Sazali's declining attitude.  The teachers have given up on Sazali.  Mansor approached Hassan and told Hassan that his love for Sazali is getting out of hand and Hassan needs to punish Sazali to ensure that he grows up to be a good boy.  Hassan, however, feels that it is not right and Sazali should only be scolded lovingly instead of harshly.  Hassan found out that Sazali had missed school and was wondering where he is.

Sazali is seen to be in town.  He starts stealing fruits from vendors and even breaks a jewellery shop window and steals the jewellery on display.  Sazali, however, is caught by the shop owner and taken to Hassan to seek compensation.  However, Hassan is not at home and Sazali steals his father's money and gives it to the shop owner.

As Hassan returns home, the maid informs Hassan that Sazali was seen giving money to a few people who came to the house.  Hassan then approaches Sazali and asked him about school.  Sazali lies to his father with smart answers.  To cover himself, Sazali said that when he was walking in town, he saw a house burning.  He gave them money because he pitied them.  Hassan, who believes Sazali's lies, shows him the house safe and gives Sazali a key to keep so that he can always help people whenever people come.  Sazali, who knows that his father believes him no matter what, starts spending the money and informs his friends that he is rich and when he wants, his father will give him money because his father loves him too much.

Sazali is now all grown up and a leader of the most wanted gangster in Singapore.  It is Sazali's birthday and a party was held in Hassan's house for Sazali.  Hassan entertains the crowd by playing the violin.  Soon after that, Hassan announces that Rokiah will be singing a song for Sazali.  After the rendition, the party ends and Sazali offers to send Rokiah and her parents home since Hassan had given Sazali a car for his birthday.

A few days later, Rokiah calls Hassan and informs him that she urgently needs to speak to him.  Rokiah arranges a meeting with Hassan at her house since her parents, Mansor and Rokiah, will be attending an evening function.  Once Hassan reaches Mansor's house, Rokiah informs Hassan that during a boat ride with Sazali, the boat had stopped in the middle of sea.  Sazali had then made his move on Rokiah and deflowered her.  According to Rokiah, now that she is pregnant with Sazali's child, Sazali refuses to marry her.  This angers Hassan.

Hassan waits for Sazali to return home.  Hassan then approaches Sazali about not marrying Rokiah since she is pregnant.  According to Sazali, he will not marry her as Rokiah is trying to put the blame on him and that the child that Rokiah is carrying is not his.  Hassan gets angry and gives Sazali an ultimatum to either marry Rokiah or leave the house.  Sazali refuses to marry Rokiah.  This angers Hassan even more and Hassan slaps Sazali.  As Hassan reaches for his cane to whack Sazali even more, Sazali stops his father arrogantly and tells Hassan that if he had done this before, Sazali would not turn out this way.  Sazali says that his father's love for him is the reason he became a leader of a group of gangsters.  Sazali then leaves Hassan's house.  Hassan is devastated.

Sazali is planning a robbery of a jewellery shop with his gang.  Sazali plans to become the leading gangster in Singapore.  During this discussion, another gangster leader walks into Sazali's lair and threatens Sazali to leave the particular area within two days.  If Sazali does not adhere to his advice, he will make sure Sazali does not live to see another day.  Sazali, in return, ambushes the gang leader and gives him an ultimatum of leaving by the next morning.  If the gang leader does not adhere to Sazali's warning, Sazali will make sure he will never live to see another day.  The gang leader agrees.

Sazali and his gang arrive at the jewellery shop and apprehended the guard on duty.  Unknown to Sazali, an eyewitness saw the robbery in progress and called the police.  The police arrived in time to chase Sazali and his gang.  A gun fight ensued.  However, Sazali managed to escape.  Due to this, Sazali made front page of the newspaper.

As Hassan was reading the morning paper, Hassan saw his son on the front page and was extremely sad to see his one and only beloved son become a fugitive.  At the same time, Hassan went to visit Mansor only to find out that Rokiah had died in an accident.  Hassan knew immediately that Rokiah had killed herself and he could not bring himself to tell Mansor the truth about Sazali's action that inconvenienced Rokiah to the point she had to kill herself.

Hassan was feeling sad when he heard constant knocking on his front door.  As he opens the door, he was surprised to see his son, Sazali.  Sazali wanted to hide out in Hassan's house until the police stopped looking for him.  Hassan half-heartedly agrees. Sazali then informs Hassan that he is hungry as he hasn't eaten since he was chased by the police.  Hassan tells Sazali to wash himself up and he will prepare some food for Sazali to eat.

Hassan brings food for Sazali and Sazali eats it up quickly.  Before Sazali retires for bed, Sazali turns on his father's recording of "Anakku Sazali" and goes to sleep.  Hassan, who is sitting in the living room, starts looking at his wife's picture and starts to think of all the things that have happened.  Hassan realises, even though it was hard to do, that the best course of action is to call the police.  After contemplating a few times, Hassan picks up the phone and calls the police.

Sazali, who is sleeping, wakes up suddenly to realise that the police is in his room.  The police takes Sazali away and Sazali quietly follows.  Hassan looks at his wife's picture, and asks for her forgiveness.

Cast
 P. Ramlee as Hassan / Sazali
 Zaiton as Mahani
 Rosnani Jamil as Rubiah
 Nordin Ahmad as Mansor
 Hashimah Yon as Rokiah
 Daeng Idris as Teacher Sulong Principals 
 Habsah Buang as Mother Mansur & Mahani 
 Malik Sutan Muda as Father Mansur & Mahani 
 Ibrahim Pendek as Gang Sazali 
 S. Kadarisman as The Actor 
 Siti Tanjung Perak as Nobility 
 HM Rohaizad
 Kemat Hassan
 Omar Suwita
 Shariff Dol
 Tony Castello as Young Sazali
 Jins Shamsuddin as Train Passengers

References
 http://cinemamalaysia.com.my/film/info/?id=Anakku_Sazali__513

External links
 
 Anakku Sazali / 1956 - Filem Malaysia
 Anak-ku Sazali / My Son Sazali (1956) at the Singapore Film Locations Archive

Singaporean drama films
Malay-language films
1956 films
Melodrama films
Malay Film Productions films
Malaysian black-and-white films
Singaporean black-and-white films
Films scored by P. Ramlee
Films set in Singapore
Films shot in Singapore
Malaysian drama films
1956 drama films